Julien Bayou (born 11 June 1980) is a French activist, lawyer and politician who has represented the 5th constituency of Paris in the National Assembly since 2022. A member of the Europe Ecology – The Greens (EELV) party, he served as its national secretary from 2019 until his resignation in 2022.

In September 2022, he withdrew from the co-presidency of the environmental group in the National Assembly and resigned from the post of national secretary of Europe Ecology – The Greens after accusations of psychological violence by an ex-companion, relayed by his opponent inside the party Sandrine Rousseau.

Family and education 
Julien Bayou was born into a leftist family. His father was an architect before becoming a healer in Béziers, and his mother, a teacher of economic and social sciences, "a real Maoist", who helped the FLN. His grandmother Marguerite is the former mayor of Saint-Chinian and his grandfather is Raoul Bayou, a former socialist deputy mayor of Cessenon-sur-Orb. Bayou studied at Lycée Turgot in Paris, before entering the Institute of Political Studies in Strasbourg and then the Institute of Political Studies in Paris. He obtained a degree in international economics, carried out in part during an internship in the writing of Alternatives Economiques, drawing up an inventory of internships in companies in France. In 2011, he obtained a law degree by taking correspondence courses.

Professional career 
After his studies, he worked at the Ministry of National Education and as a consultant for Unesco. From 2005 to 2008, he was project manager for Africa within Coordination SUD (the French coordination of international solidarity NGOs). In 2008, he left the NGO to set up a "communication and mobilization consultancy" cooperative with his friend and partner Lionel Primault.

In 2013, he was in charge of campaigns for Avaaz, an NGO which mobilizes on various international issues, such as climate change, human rights, corruption and poverty. It is in this context that he takes part in the campaign to liberate the young Sevil Sevimli, a Franco-Turkish student imprisoned in Turkey for having participated in a concert.

In 2022, he leads the Green coalition into the Nouvelle Union Populaire Ecologique et Sociale ("NUPES") in the French parliamentary elections. He wins his seat representing the 5th constituency of Paris and is then elected as co-president of the green parlimentary group in the National Assembly.

Books 
 Le Petit Livre noir du logement, collectif, éditions La Découverte, 2009
 Dix bonnes raisons d'aimer (ou pas) l'éducation populaire, I love educ pop, under the direction of Damien Cerqueus and Mikaël Garnier-Lavalley, Editions de l'Atelier, 2010
 Kerviel, une affaire d'État : 2 milliards pour la Société en général, préface ny Eva Joly, Arcane 17, 2016
 Désobéissons pour sauver l'Europe, Editions Rue de l'échiquier, 2018

Notes 

1980 births
Living people
French activists
Europe Ecology – The Greens politicians
21st-century French politicians
Politicians from Paris
Sciences Po alumni
Members of Parliament for Paris
Deputies of the 16th National Assembly of the French Fifth Republic
Members of the Regional Council of Île-de-France